Godman is a both a surname and a given name. Notable people with the name include:

Surname 
 Alice Godman (1868–1944), British charity worker
 Buda Godman (1888–1945), American criminal
 David Godman (born 1953), author of books on Ramana Maharshi's teachings and disciples
 Frederick DuCane Godman (1834–1919), English naturalist
 Janet Godman (born 1966), English cricketer
 Norman Godman (1937–2018), Scottish politician
 Phil Godman (born 1982), Scottish rugby union player
 Trish Godman (1939–2019), Scottish politician

Given name 
 Godman Irvine

See also 
 Ivars Godmanis